Greg Tagert (born January 5, 1963) is a professional baseball manager and coach. He's most notable as manager for the Gary SouthShore RailCats of the American Association of Professional Baseball, a position he held from 2005 until leaving on February 7, 2022, to join the San Francisco Giants organization.

About
Tagert, a native of Vacaville, California, attended San Francisco State University where he served as a pitcher. He went on to coach at the University of New Mexico and later served as a scout for the Detroit Tigers.

He managed nine years for five different clubs in the Frontier League. After his first year in the Frontier League, he had a very short stint in the Prairie League as manager for the Brainerd Bobcats, a team that folded after two weeks.

In 2005, he became the new manager of the Gary SouthShore RailCats, a team that held the league record for losses. That same year, the RailCats won the Northern League championship. The RailCats made it to the Championship series four years in a row, winning twice. In 2008, the RailCats extended his contract until 2010. As a result, Tagert relocated his family from Vacaville to Northwest Indiana.

On Saturday, February 20, 2010, the RailCats announced that his contract was being extended until 2013. A year later, in 2011, the Northern League folded and the RailCats, along with the Kansas City T-Bones, Fargo-Moorhead RedHawks, and Winnipeg Goldeyes, moved to the American Association for the 2011 season. Tagert guided Gary to their first AA championship in 2013.

After suffering the first full losing season of his career in 2015, Tagert rebounded to guide the RailCats back to the postseason in 2017, followed by the first division title since 2008 (when they were in the Northern League). Both seasons ended in first-round playoff exits.

Gary slipped to fifth place (our of six teams) in the North Division in 2019 before sitting out the 2020 season due to the COVID-19 pandemic. Upon returning in 2021, the RailCats slipped further, suffering their first last-place finish under Tagert's watch. This proved to be his final season in a RailCats uniform.

On February 7, 2022, the RailCats announced that Tagert was leaving the organization to take a position within the San Francisco Giants organization, ending his 17-year tenure in Gary. Tagert has been tapped as the manager of the Arizona Complex League Giants.

On Dec 22, 2022, Tagert was announced as the new manager of the Winnipeg Goldeyes of the American Association. He replaces long-time manager Rick Forney.

Records and awards
Frontier League
Most career wins
Manager of the Year (2001)
Northern League
Manager of the Year (2007, 2009)

Year-by-Year Managerial Record

References

External links

Bio on RailCats site

1963 births
Living people
Gary SouthShore RailCats managers
San Francisco State University alumni
American Association of Professional Baseball managers
Northern League (baseball, 1993–2010) managers
People from Vacaville, California